Michael Ausiello  (born February 23, 1972) is an American television industry journalist, author, and actor. He was a senior writer at TV Guide and its companion website, TVGuide.com, between 2000 and 2008. From 2008 to 2010, he wrote and reported for Entertainment Weekly before launching his own television news site, TVLine. Ausiello also published a memoir in 2017, Spoiler Alert: The Hero Dies.

Early life 
Ausiello grew up in Roselle Park, New Jersey,  and attended Roselle Park High School. He is a graduate of the University of Southern California.

Career 
Ausiello spent three years as the senior news editor of Soaps In Depth magazine and served as media relations coordinator at Entertainment Tonight. He began writing for TV Guide in 2000. During his eight-year tenure at TV Guide, he wrote for both the magazine and its website. Ausiello's columns at TV Guide included Today's News, The Ausiello Report, a weekly print column that expanded into a regularly updated blog online, and Ask Ausiello, an exclusively online weekly Q&A. Ausiello contributed to the website's weekly podcast, TV Guide Talk and the weekly TV Guide Channel program The 411 with a five-minute segment entitled "The Big Five", where he commented on the top five entertainment industry stories of the week. Ausiello also had a vodcast version of The Ausiello Report.

Ausiello has also contributed commentary to media outlets outside of TV Guide, such as Today, Good Morning America, Fox & Friends, American Morning, Inside Edition, Extra, Access Hollywood, and Entertainment Tonight. He is a regular guest every Friday morning on Sirius Satellite Radio's popular morning show, "OutQ in the Morning" (Channel 109) with host Larry Flick, where they converse with callers about all things television—shows, stars, and plot lines, including scoops and spoilers.

Having become friends with actors and producers such as Amy Sherman-Palladino, Ausiello has appeared in a few cameo roles on episodes of television series including Gilmore Girls, Veronica Mars, and Scrubs.

Personal life 
Ausiello is a pesca-vegetarian, and resides in New York City. Ausiello is gay and was married to photographer Kit Cowan. Cowan died of a rare form of neuroendocrine cancer on February 5, 2015. Ausiello chronicled the last year of Cowan's life, and their 13-year relationship, in his 2017 memoir Spoiler Alert: The Hero Dies. A film based on that memoir, Spoiler Alert, was released on December 2, 2022, starring Jim Parsons as Ausiello.

Filmography

Film

Television

Bibliography 
 Spoiler Alert: The Hero Dies: A Memoir of Love, Loss, and Other Four-Letter Words (2017)

See also

 LGBT culture in New York City
 List of LGBT people from New York City
 New Yorkers in journalism

References

External links 
 
 

1972 births
Living people
American male television actors
American gay actors
American gay writers
American male journalists
American LGBT journalists
People from Roselle Park, New Jersey
Male actors from New Jersey
LGBT people from New Jersey
University of Southern California alumni
21st-century American male actors
21st-century American male writers
21st-century American journalists